Bentivegna is an Italian surname. Notable people with the surname include:

Accursio Bentivegna (born 1996), Italian footballer
Christopher Bentivegna, American singer, actor and theatre director
Francesco Bentivegna (1820–1856), Italian patriot

Italian-language surnames